Illuppur taluk is a taluk of Pudukkottai district of the Indian state of Tamil Nadu. Its headquarters  is the town of Iluppur. It is the one of the famous cities in Pudukottai district with three famous temples, and one church is there: Sri tharamthooki pidari amman kovil, Ponvasinathar temple (lord siva) and Srinivasa perumal temple (lord Perumal).St.Antony church and also three mosques is there.  The Taluk office was constructed and opened in 2009.

Here there are three banks: Indian Overseas bank, Indian Bank and Central Bank of India.

From Trichy it is 40.1km from Pudukkottai it is 27.8 km & 35 minutes.

There is a government hospital in Illuppur.

Schools:
 R.C. Higher Secondary School
 Government Higher Secondary School
 Maharishi Vidhya Mandir CBSE School
 Mother Terasa Matriculation School
 Arul Malar Matriculation School

Foundations:
 Aims Foundation
 Aims Computer

Information 
According to the 2011 census, the taluk of Illuppur had a population of 218,961 with 108,866  males and 110,095 females. There were 1011 women for every 1000 men. The taluk had a literacy rate of 63.38. Child population in the age group below 6 was 12,718 males and 12,135 females.

References 

Taluks of Pudukkottai district